The Last Word is an offbeat romantic comedy-drama film written and directed by Geoffrey Haley. It stars Winona Ryder and Wes Bentley. It had its world premiere at the Sundance Film Festival in January, and it had a wider release in 2008.

Plot
An odd-but-gifted poet, Evan Merck (Wes Bentley), makes his living writing suicide notes for the soon-to-be departed. When he meets Charlotte (Winona Ryder), the free-spirited sister of his latest client, Evan lies about his relationship to her late, lamented brother. Curiously attracted by his evasive charms, a smitten Charlotte begins her pursuit, forcing Evan to juggle an amorous new girlfriend, a sarcastic new client (Ray Romano) and an ever-increasing mountain of lies.

Cast
Winona Ryder as Charlotte Morris
Wes Bentley as Evan
Ray Romano as Abel
Gina Hecht as Hilde Morris
A. J. Trauth as Greg
John Billingsley as Brady
Kurt Caceres as Sammy
Michael Cornacchia as Client

References

External links

2008 films
2008 comedy-drama films
American comedy-drama films
Films scored by John Swihart
2000s English-language films
2000s American films